R Train may refer to:
R (New York City Subway service)
R-Line (Norfolk Southern), a secondary railway line between Charlotte, North Carolina, and Columbia, South Carolina
MTR Hyundai Rotem EMU in MTR, Hong Kong